Beli Breg is a former settlement in the Municipality of Krško in northeastern Slovenia. It is now part of the village of Leskovec pri Krškem. The area is part of the traditional region of Lower Carniola. The municipality is now included in the Lower Sava Statistical Region.

Geography

History
Beli Breg was annexed by Leskovec pri Krškem in 1952, ending its existence as an independent settlement.

References

External links
Beli Breg at Geopedia

Populated places in the Municipality of Krško
Former settlements in Slovenia